María María is a Venezuelan telenovela which starred Alba Roversi and Arturo Peniche. It was produced and broadcast on Marte TV in 1990.

Synopsis 
María María is the continuing story of Julia Mendoza who, after suffering amnesia from an accident, assumes the identity of Maria Alcantara, a young, frivolous millionaire. Julia's innocent act has startling repercussions, which shatter her life and the lives of those around her. Maria and Julia are in a terrible car accident together but only Julia is found at the accident site. She is horribly disfigured and is mistaken for María when she is unable to remember even her name. Later, she undergoes plastic surgery and is recreated as Maria. While a gang of beggars holds the real Maria, who also survived the crash, captive, Julia adopts Maria's identity. She grows to love Maria's husband, Esteban Araujo, who is accused of the death of her father. Julia's memory finally returns and life becomes an endless cycle of struggles, passion and torments.

Cast 
 Alba Roversi as María
 Arturo Peniche
 Julie Restifo
Mara Croatto
 Veronica Ortiz as Silvia
 Luis Alberto de Mozos
 Aroldo Betancourt
 Eric Noriega

External links

1990 telenovelas
1990 Venezuelan television series debuts
1990 Venezuelan television series endings
Spanish-language telenovelas
Venezuelan telenovelas
Venevisión telenovelas
Television shows set in Caracas